Salulolo Aumua (born 12 December 1964) is a Samoan boxer. He competed in the men's light middleweight event at the 1984 Summer Olympics.

References

1964 births
Living people
Samoan male boxers
Olympic boxers of Samoa
Boxers at the 1984 Summer Olympics
Place of birth missing (living people)
Light-middleweight boxers